Irenosen Iseghohi Okojie  FRSL is a Nigerian-born short story and novel writer working in London. Her stories incorporate speculative elements and also make use of her West African heritage. Her first novel, Butterfly Fish won a Betty Trask Award in 2016, and her story "Grace Jones" won the 2020 Caine Prize for African Writing. She was elected as a Fellow of the Royal Society of Literature in 2018.

Biography

Early years and education
Irenosen Okojie was born in Nigeria. When she was eight her family moved to the United Kingdom. Okojie attended Gresham's, a boarding school in Holt, Norfolk, before going on to St Angela's Convent School in East London and then to Stamford Boarding School for girls.  Okojie returned to London to complete her education and then attended London Metropolitan University, where she studied Communications and Visual Culture.

Career
Okojie is an Arts Project Manager and Curator based in London. Her debut novel, Butterfly Fish, won a Betty Trask Award in 2016. Her writing has been published in The New York Times, The Observer, The Guardian, the BBC and the Huffington Post, and she is a contributor to the 2019 anthology New Daughters of Africa, edited by Margaret Busby.

Okojie has received nominations for a number of awards and she has been a judge for other literary competitions. Her 2016 collection of short stories, Speak Gigantular, was shortlisted for the 2016 inaugural Jhalak Prize as well as the 2017 Edge Hill Short Story Prize. Her story Animal Parts was nominated for a 2016 Shirley Jackson Award, and her short story Synsepalum was broadcast on BBC Radio 4 to celebrate the BBC National Short Story Award 2018.

Also in 2018, Okojie was elected as a Fellow of the Royal Society of Literature. On 19 May 2020, she was shortlisted for the Caine Prize for African Writing, and was announced as the winner on 27 July 2020 for her story "Grace Jones".

Okojie was appointed Member of the Order of the British Empire (MBE) in the 2021 Birthday Honours for services to literature.

Honours and awards

 2016: Betty Trask Award (for Butterfly Fish)
 2018: Elected a Fellow of the Royal Society of Literature
 2020: winner of AKO Caine Prize for African Writing (with "Grace Jones")

Bibliography

 Speak Gigantular (short stories), Jacaranda Books 2016
 Butterfly Fish (novel), Jacaranda Books 2016
 Nudibranch, Hachette 2019

References and sources

External links
 Official website

Living people
21st-century English novelists
21st-century English women writers
Alumni of London Metropolitan University
Black British women writers
Caine Prize winners
English novelists
English women novelists
Fellows of the Royal Society of Literature
Members of the Order of the British Empire
Naturalised citizens of the United Kingdom
Nigerian emigrants to the United Kingdom
Nigerian novelists
Nigerian women novelists
People educated at Gresham's School
Year of birth missing (living people)